Buzara forceps is a moth of the family Erebidae. It is found in Sumatra and Borneo.

References

External links
Species info

Calpinae
Moths described in 1985